Julio Arturo Macias (born March 20, 1990) is a Mexican actor. Following a series of cameo appearances, Macias had his breakthrough playing Oscar Diaz on the comedy-drama series On My Block (2018–2021), for which he received two Imagen Award nominations. He has also portrayed singer-songwriter Pete Astudillo in the biographical drama Selena: The Series (2020–2021).

Early life
Macias was born in Mexico City, Mexico on March 20, 1990. As a child, his family moved to the United States, leading to Macias attempting to assimilate into its culture.

Filmography

Television

References 

1990 births
American actors
Living people
Mexican emigrants to the United States